The girls' 5 kilometre freestyle cross-country skiing competition at the 2016 Winter Youth Olympics was held on 18 February at the Birkebeineren Ski Stadium.

Results
The race was started at 10:00.

References

Cross-country skiing at the 2016 Winter Youth Olympics